Mare Island is a peninsula in the city of Vallejo, California.

Mare Island  may also refer to:

 Mare Island Naval Shipyard, a former naval base on California's Mare island
 Mare Island (Indonesia), a volcano
 Maré Island, an atoll in the Loyalty Islands